Touroultia obscurella is a species of beetle in the family Cerambycidae. It was described by Henry Walter Bates in 1865, originally under the genus Hypselomus. It is known from Brazil.

References

Onciderini
Beetles described in 1865